The 2017 FFA Cup Final was the 4th final of the premier association football knockout cup competition in Australia. The match was held at Allianz Stadium, as determined by Football Federation Australia (FFA), making it the first FFA Cup Final hosted in Sydney. Melbourne City were the defending champions, however they were defeated 2–0 by Sydney FC in the quarter-finals. Sydney FC went on to defeat South Melbourne in the semi-finals to make their second FFA Cup Final appearance. Adelaide United defeated Western Sydney Wanderers 2–1 in the semi-finals to also make their second FFA Cup Final appearance.

Road to the final

Sydney FC and Adelaide United were among 735 teams who entered the FFA Cup competition, and as A-League clubs, both entered the tournament in the Round of 32.

Sydney FC's first match was away against Darwin Rovers, whom they trounced 8–0. In the Round of 16, Sydney FC defeated fellow Sydney club Bankstown Berries 3–0. In their quarter final, they defeated fellow A-League club and reigning champions Melbourne City 2–0 at Leichhardt Oval. Their semi-final opponents, South Melbourne were comprehensively beaten 5–1.

Adelaide United's FFA Cup journey began with a 1–0 win over the Newcastle Jets at Marden Sports Complex. They then defeated rivals Melbourne Victory 3–0 at home. United's quarter final match-up saw them easily account for Heidelberg United 3–0 away at Olympic Village, Melbourne. In the semi-finals, United took on the Western Sydney Wanderers at Campbelltown Stadium and came out 2–1 victors in front of over 5,000 spectators.

Match

Details

Statistics

See also
 2017 FFA Cup

References

External links
 Official website

FFA Cup
2017 in Australian soccer
Australia Cup finals